Ashton Baumann (born January 5, 1993) is a Canadian competition swimmer who specializes in the breaststroke. Baumann competed for Canada at the 2016 Summer Olympics in the 200 m breaststroke. He is the son of former Canadian Olympic swimmer Alex Baumann.

He relocated to Ottawa with his family at age 14, attending Canterbury High School, and first became interested in competitive swimming when he joined the Greater Ottawa Kingfish Swim Club. In 2016, he was named to Canada's Olympic team for the 2016 Summer Olympics.

References

External links
 
 
 
 
 
 

1993 births
Living people
Australian people of Czech descent
Canadian people of Czech descent
Sportspeople from the Gold Coast, Queensland
Swimmers from Ottawa
Canadian male breaststroke swimmers
Swimmers at the 2016 Summer Olympics
Olympic swimmers of Canada